Robert Finley was the president of the University of Georgia.

Robert Finley may also refer to:

Bob Finley, baseball player
Robert Finley (musician), American blues musician

See also
Robert Finlay, 1st Viscount Finlay, British lawyer, doctor and politician
Robert Findley, soccer player
Robert Findlay (disambiguation)